John A. Johnson (July 9, 1883 in Litchfield, Minnesota – February 3, 1962) was a Minnesota politician and a Speaker of the Minnesota House of Representatives. He served three decades in the Minnesota legislature, 20 of those years in the Minnesota House.

Johnson was a hardware store owner in Preston, Minnesota, when he was first elected to the Minnesota House of Representatives in 1920. He caucused with the Conservative caucus in the then-nonpartisan legislature. In 1925, he was elected Speaker of the House, a position he held until he left the legislature in 1931.

Johnson served as postmaster of the house during his time out of office, and returned to the legislature as a representative in 1939, serving ten years, most of that as chair of the Municipal Affairs committee. In 1949, he moved to the Minnesota Senate after winning a special election. He retired from the legislature in 1959.

References

1883 births
1962 deaths
Republican Party Minnesota state senators
Speakers of the Minnesota House of Representatives
Republican Party members of the Minnesota House of Representatives
20th-century American politicians
People from Litchfield, Minnesota
People from Preston, Minnesota